SH2 domain-containing protein 2A is a protein that in humans is encoded by the SH2D2A gene.

Interactions 

SH2D2A has been shown to interact with MAP3K2.

References

Further reading